"Jam Up and Jelly Tight" is a song written by Tommy Roe and Freddy Weller and performed by Roe. The song was produced by Steve Barri and arranged by Mike Henderson.

Chart performance
It reached number 5 in both Canada and Australia and also number 8 on the Billboard Hot 100 in 1970.  It was featured on his 1970 album, 12 in a Roe: A Collection of Tommy Roe's Greatest Hits.

Other versions
Teenage Head released a version on their 1986 album Trouble in the Jungle.

References

1969 songs
1969 singles
Songs written by Tommy Roe
Songs written by Freddy Weller
Tommy Roe songs
ABC Records singles